"Clarity" is a song by Russian-German DJ Zedd featuring the vocals of British singer Foxes. It was released on November 14, 2012 as the third single from the debut studio album of the same name. The song was written by Anton Zaslavski, Matthew Koma, Porter Robinson and Skylar Grey and produced by Zedd. It was released as iTunes Single of the Week on October 2, 2012, and as an 4-track remix EP on February 12, 2013, by Interscope Records. Zedd released an extended mix of the song exclusively on Beatport on February 18, 2018.

When Matthew listened to Foxes' song "Youth", he Skyped her and asked her to be the vocalist on "Clarity". After Foxes did research on Wikipedia about Zedd, she accepted the offer. In June 2014, following the success of "Stay the Night" featuring Hayley Williams in the United Kingdom, Clarity was re-released there, and this time reached a better peak of number 27, compared to the previous one of 29 in 2013. It ended up being awarded silver certification by the BPI following the intake of streaming into Official Charts data in the UK.

The extended play of the track was released on February 18, 2013. It features ten remixes including Tiësto, Headhunterz and Funkagenda, among others. From December 2012 to February 4, 2013, Zedd hosted a remix contest for the track. There were 982 official entries. The winning remix by Tom Budin was due to be featured on an upcoming Zedd release.

"Clarity" won the Grammy Award for Best Dance Recording at the 56th Grammy Awards, becoming their first win.

Critical reception
Idolator editor Sam Lansky praised the vocals produced by Foxes, and praised Zedd for "[transforming] his EDM sound into a lovely, downtempo emo-style set."

Composition
"Clarity" has a tempo of 128 beats per minute, and is written in the A♭ major key. Its main chord progression is B♭m7sus4/E♭/Fm7/Cm7/D♭ – B♭m7sus4/E♭/Fm7/Cm7/D♭/A♭.

Music video
A music video for "Clarity" directed by Jodeb was released on 11 January 2013. The music video featured Foxes and actor and model AJ English as a couple. The video starts with the camera panning over the desert, and later switching to see Foxes and the male lead driving in different cars, until they suddenly collide head-to-head, with enough force for both characters to rocket backward. The male lead wakes up after being knocked unconscious from the collision, and finds the injured Foxes. However, she runs away through the desert, making him follow her until she falls unconscious in the sand. A rewind of the whole event was shown afterwards, before in the final scene, the two people drive in the same car, presumably enjoying themselves. All scenes were accompanied by computer effects of collisions and other images that synchronize with the music. The music video also features a cameo from Zedd.

As of May 2021, the video has received more than 300 million views on YouTube.

Usage in other media and cover versions
The song was also featured as the background music of the introduction video of F1 2013. The song was covered by Jessica Sanchez in her 2013 guest starring on Glee where she performed this song for Regionals competition in the episode "All or Nothing". Jessica also performed an acoustic version of this song with Zedd which was uploaded on YouTube. Michelle Chamuel also covered this song on the fourth season of the North American version of The Voice. The song was covered on the third season of The X Factor USA during the audition round by auditionee Rylie Brown and the four chair challenge by Ellona Santiago. It debuted on the Billboard Hot 100 at number 86, peaked at number 8, and was his first entry on the Billboard Hot 100 and his most successful song in the United States and worldwide. It has sold 2,238,000 copies in the United States as of March 2014. This song was performed by Jena Irene on American Idol 2014. Charlie Puth has an acoustic cover as well. Angelica Hale performed it during the quarterfinals of the America's Got Talent season 12. A Korean version by Kim Jisoo of BlackPink covered the song for the 2019 World Tour of Blackpink. Clarity is also featured in Konami's latest Dance Dance Revolution arcade game release, Dance Dance Revolution A20. American rapper Ice Spice also heavily sampled the song's chorus in her 2021 single, "No Clarity". The song was featured as a remix session on GarageBand. In 2022, Porter Robinson officially took credit for ghost writing Clarity as well as making a live version for Second Sky.

Track listing

Charts and certifications

Weekly charts

Year-end charts

Decade-end charts

Certifications

Release history

See also
 List of number-one dance singles of 2013 (U.S.)

References

External links

"Clarity" on Spotify

2012 songs
2012 singles
2013 singles
Foxes (singer) songs
Zedd songs
Grammy Award for Best Dance Recording
Interscope Records singles
Songs written by Matthew Koma
Songs written by Skylar Grey
Songs written by Zedd
Songs written by Porter Robinson